Çallı can refer to:

 Çallı, Burhaniye, Turkey
 Çallı, Güroymak, Turkey
 Çallı, Zardab, Azerbaijan

Calli can refer to: Callus (cell biology).